Microbulbifer marinus is a Gram-negative, aerobic bacterium found in marine sediment. Its type strain is Y215T (=CGMCC 1.10657T =JCM 17211T).

References

Further reading

Whitman, William B., et al., eds. Bergey's manual® of systematic bacteriology. Vol. 5. Springer, 2012.

External links
LPSN
Type strain of Microbulbifer marinus at BacDive -  the Bacterial Diversity Metadatabase

Alteromonadales
Bacteria described in 2012